Pacific Junction may refer to:

Pacific Junction, Iowa, USA
Pacific Junction, New Brunswick, located in Westmorland County, New Brunswick, Canada

See also
Northern and Pacific Junction Railway, a railway company now part of the Canadian National Railway Company